Anantaram (Malayalam: അനന്തരം), also known as Monologue, is a 1987 Indian Malayalam-language film produced, written and directed by Adoor Gopalakrishnan. It stars Mammootty, Ashokan and Shobhana in the lead. The film is structured like a monologue. It develops through a commentary by the protagonist about himself in the first person. The attempt of the protagonist is to narrate how his undiagnosed psychosis led him where he is now. The film was an experimental film for its time as it did not have a linear narrative.

The film won the 1987 FIPRESCI Prize at the Karlovy Vary International Film Festival and three National Film Awards- for Best Director, Best Screenplay and Best Audiography. It was included in an online poll by IBN Live listing 100 greatest Indian films of all time.

Plot
The film develops through a commentary by Ajayan (Ashokan) about himself in the first person. Later he tells another story about his life with the same background. Finally both these stories fuse together.

Ajayan is born an orphan. He is brought up by a doctor. A brilliant child, Ajayan grows up as a reclusive person and a confused youth. The beautiful Suma (Shobhana) arrives at their house after marrying Balu (Mammootty), his foster-brother. After Balan's marriage to Suma, Ajayan starts getting attracted to her at the very first sight. This eventually creates internal conflicts and guilt within himself. Ultimately this leads Ajayan to leave the house which ends in a disaster.

In the second story Ajayan narrates his confused youth and about the beautiful girl, Nalini who enters his life. Ajayan's mind shifts often between reality and an imaginary romantic world. Finally both these stories converge to a point where Nalini is Suma, his template for delusional escape. He in the end of his monologue says he is unsure whether he has said everything, and a young boy is shown skipping numbers while counting each treads of a stair.

Cast
 Ashokan as Ajayan
 Shobhana as Sumangali and Nalini
Mammootty as Dr Balu
 Sudheesh as teenage Ajayan
 Bahadoor as Driver Mathai
 Vembayam Thambi as Raman Nair
 Azeez (actor) as the gambler
 Kukku as the nurse
 Krishnankutty Nair as the ailing patient at the dispensary
 Kaviyoor Ponnamma as Yogini Amma
 Adoor Pankajam as Lakshmi Amma

Themes
In Anantaram, the theme of perception is dealt with through the protagonist, a youth who, like Adoor, has a bipolar character. In an interview, Adoor said, "Anantaram is basically about perceptions. About a young, impressionable boy who lacks some sort of functioning. Though, my life was not very familiar, but I was searching for the familiar experience of growing up, struggling with life and relationships. What is in the frame and what is juxtaposed to it just outside the frame... or let us put it this way, it has to do with attuning to the reality just beyond perception. Actually this is part of daily experience though we don't analyse it."

Critical reception
The film upon release got mixed reviews from critics and general consensus was that the film didn't meet the expectations of an Adoor Gopalakrishnan film. However, modern reception is more positive. The film is now considered way ahead of its time. It is regarded by critics to be one of Adoor Gopalakrishnan's best works.

Awards
The film has been nominated for and won the following awards since its release:

1987 FIPRESCI Prize (Karlovy Vary)

1987 National Film Awards (India)
 Won - Best Director - Adoor Gopalakrishnan
 Won - Best Screenplay - Adoor Gopalakrishnan
 Won - Best Audiography - P. Devadas, T. Krishnanunni, N. Harikumar

References

External links

Of Life...On Films...: Adoor on Anantaram

Further reading
 

1987 films
Films directed by Adoor Gopalakrishnan
1980s Malayalam-language films
1987 drama films
Films whose director won the Best Director National Film Award
Films that won the Best Audiography National Film Award
Films whose writer won the Best Original Screenplay National Film Award
Indian drama films